The list of Border Conference football champions includes eight teams that won the college football championship awarded by the defunct Border Conference during its existence from 1931 through 1961. In total, 9 teams sponsored football in the conference. Arizona State Teacher's College of Flagstaff (now Northern Arizona University) was the only member to never win a Border Conference football championship.

Champions by year

Championships by team

"†" Denotes shared title

Notes

References

Border Conference
Champions